West Virginia Route 2 is a state highway in the US state of West Virginia. It generally parallels the Ohio River along the western border of the state, from U.S. Route 60 in Huntington (just west of the East End Bridge) northeasterly to U.S. Route 30 in Chester (just south of the Jennings Randolph Memorial Bridge).

WV 2 leaves the shores of the Ohio River in two places: between Point Pleasant and Mount Alto (where West Virginia Route 62 follows the river) and between Ravenswood and Waverly (where West Virginia Route 68 mostly follows the river). The entire route is included as a part of the National Highway System, a system of routes determined to be the most important for the nation's economy, mobility, and defense.

Route

Huntington to Parkersburg 

WV 2 was reconstructed from Lesage to Glenwood as an improved two-lane highway with shoulders on a four-lane right-of-way in the mid-1980s.

Parkersburg to Wheeling 
WV 2 follows the Ohio River from Parkersburg to Wheeling. Portions have been upgraded to four and five lanes, with eventual plans to upgrade the entire corridor.

Wheeling to Chester 
WV 2 is a variable two-lane and four-lane highway from Wheeling to its northern terminus at Chester.

For a time, Route 2 deviated from its current alignment to follow a more northeasterly route from New Cumberland to US 30 via the unincorporated area of New Manchester.  The current alignment of WV 2 passing the Mountaineer Race Track and Gaming Resort to US 30 was formerly numbered WV 66 and is reflected as such in many of the county highways in the area.  The former routing of WV 2 is now WV 8.

On June 23, 2000, work began on a project that widened WV 2 from two to four lanes from Weirton at US 22 (Robert C. Byrd Expressway) south to CR 8 near Follansbee. The project length was just 0.9 miles. Work was supposed to be complete by June 2001, however, construction wrapped up on October 31 at a cost of $21,444,875.  The project entailed stabilizing the hillside by reshaping the highwall, widening the roadway with four  lanes, creating  outside shoulders, and  interior shoulders. 3.9 million cubic yards of earth were removed during the excavation process.

Notes 
 The state route is the subject of Driving Up the Ohio River on Route 2 in Late Fall, a poem by Larry Smith. The poem was featured on the October 26, 2006 edition of The Writer's Almanac radio program.

Major intersections

References

002
West Virginia Route 002
West Virginia Route 002
West Virginia Route 002
West Virginia Route 002
West Virginia Route 002
West Virginia Route 002
West Virginia Route 002
West Virginia Route 002
West Virginia Route 002
West Virginia Route 002
West Virginia Route 002